Royalton Township is a civil township of Berrien County in the U.S. state of Michigan, a few miles southeast of the city of St. Joseph. The population was 4,766 at the 2010 census, up from 3,888 at the 2000 census. There are no incorporated municipalities in the township, but portions are considered to be part of the Benton Harbor/St. Joseph urban area. The unincorporated communities of Hollywood, Scottdale, Arden, and Buckhorn are within the township.

Royalton Township was organized in 1835 and originally included portions of Lincoln Charter Township, Sodus Township, and St. Joseph Charter Township.

Geography
Lincoln Charter Township lies directly to the west. St. Joseph Charter Township is to the northwest. The St. Joseph River forms the eastern boundary of the township. Sodus Township lies across the river. Oronoko Charter Township lies to the south and Baroda Township to the southwest.

M-139 runs northwest–southeast through the township. Interstate 94 and M-63 are accessible in the northwest of the township.

Demographics
As of the census of 2000, there were 3,888 people, 1,299 households, and 1,084 families residing in the township. The racial makeup of the township was 93.29% White, 2.03% African American, 0.15% Native American, 2.44% Asian, 1.34% from other races, and 0.75% from two or more races. Hispanic or Latino of any race were 3.42% of the population.

There were 1,299 households, out of which 41.6% had children under the age of 18 living with them, 75.8% were married couples living together, 5.8% had a female householder with no husband present, and 16.5% were non-families. 14.1% of all households were made up of individuals, and 6.3% had someone living alone who was 65 years of age or older.  The average household size was 2.86 and the average family size was 3.16.

In the township the population was spread out, with 28.5% under the age of 18, 4.8% from 18 to 24, 26.7% from 25 to 44, 26.1% from 45 to 64, and 13.9% who were 65 years of age or older.  The median age was 40 years. For every 100 females, there were 98.8 males.  For every 100 females age 18 and over, there were 95.4 males.

The median income for a household in the township was $69,375, and the median income for a family was $76,295. Males had a median income of $50,833 versus $28,750 for females. The per capita income for the township was $26,926.  About 7.6% of families and 9.4% of the population were below the poverty line, including 9.4% of those under age 18 and 27.5% of those age 65 or over.

Emergency services
Police protection in Royalton Township is provided by the Berrien County Sheriff's Department and Michigan State Police, although in the event of a priority dispatch, assistance is sometimes offered by nearby municipal police forces, including Lincoln Charter Township PD, Baroda/Lake Township PD, Saint Joseph Charter Township PD, and Berrien Springs/Oronoko Township PD, depending on circumstances of the call, location within the township, and availability of State or County police units. Emergency medical services are provided by Medic1 Community Ambulance Service. Fire protection is provided by Royalton Township Fire Department. This department offers full rescue and extrication capabilities, and took delivery in late 2007 of a new rescue/pumper apparatus, designated "1771", from Spencer Manufacturing of South Haven, Michigan.

References

External links
Royalton Township official website

Townships in Berrien County, Michigan
Townships in Michigan